Owen Heard (born 29 December 2001) is an English international track and field athlete. He has represented England at the Commonwealth Games.

Biography
Heard was educated at Loughborough University and in 2022 recorded a jump of 5.45 metres in winning the BoXX United World Athletics Continental Tour pole vault event. He also competes in hurdles events.

In 2022, he was selected for the men's pole vault event at the 2022 Commonwealth Games in Birmingham.

References

2001 births
Living people
English male pole vaulters
British male pole vaulters
British male athletes
Commonwealth Games competitors for England
Athletes (track and field) at the 2022 Commonwealth Games